Foresight is the ability to predict, or the action of predicting, what will happen or   what is needed in the future. Studies suggest that much of human daily thought is directed towards potential future events. Because of this and its role in human control on the planet, the nature and evolution of foresight is an important topic in psychology.  Thinking about the future is also studied under the label prospection. Recent neuroscientific, developmental, and cognitive studies have identified many commonalities to the human ability to recall past episodes. Science magazine selected new evidence for such commonalities one of the top ten scientific breakthroughs of 2007. However, there are fundamental differences between mentally travelling through time into the future (i.e., foresight) versus mentally travelling through time into the past (i.e., episodic memory).

In management 
Foresight has been classified as a behaviour (covert and/or overt) in management, a review, analysis, and synthesis of past definitions and usages of the foresight concept into a generic definition, in order to make the concept measurable.

Specifically, foresight has been defined as: "Degree of analyzing present contingencies and degree of moving the analysis of present contingencies across time, and degree of analyzing a desired future state or states a degree ahead in time with regard to contingencies under control, as well as degree of analyzing courses of action a degree ahead in time to arrive at the desired future state."

Prediction market are exchange-traded markets created for the purpose of trading the outcome of events. This economic theory is credited to economists Ludwig von Mises and Friedrich Hayek. Prediction Market gives the ability  to aggregate information and make accurate predictions based on the Efficient Market Hypothesis, which states that assets prices are fully reflecting all available information. For instance, existing share prices always include all the relevant related information for the stock market to make accurate predictions.

See also 

 Future-oriented therapy
 Future orientation
 Futures techniques
 Goal orientation
 Goal setting
 Prospection
 Retrocognition
 Vision (spirituality)

References 

Cognitive psychology
Management
Prediction